Conomurex is a genus of sea snails, marine gastropod mollusks in the family Strombidae, the true conchs.

Species
Species within the genus Conomurex include:
Conomurex coniformis (Sowerby, 1842)
Conomurex decorus (Röding, 1798)
Conomurex fasciatus (Born, 1778)
Conomurex luhuanus (Linnaeus, 1758)
Conomurex persicus (Swainson, 1821)

References

 Bandel K. (2007) About the larval shell of some Stromboidea, connected to a review of the classification and phylogeny of the Strombimorpha (Caenogastropoda). Freiberger Forschungshefte, ser. C 524: 97-206
 Liverani V. (2014) The superfamily Stromboidea. Addenda and corrigenda. In: G.T. Poppe, K. Groh & C. Renker (eds), A conchological iconography. pp. 1-54, pls 131-164. Harxheim: Conchbooks.

External links
 Fischer P. (1880-1887). Manuel de Conchyliologie et de Paléontologie Conchyliologique. Paris, Savy pp. XXIV + 1369 + pl. 23

Strombidae